Admiral David Glasgow Farragut, also known as the Admiral Farragut Monument, is an outdoor bronze statue of David Farragut by Augustus Saint-Gaudens on a stone sculptural exedra designed by the architect Stanford White, installed in Manhattan's Madison Square, in the U.S. state of New York.

Description and history
The statue, cast in 1880 and dedicated on May 25, 1881, is set on a Coopersburg, Pennsylvania black granite pedestal. The work depicts Farragut, the noted United States Navy admiral of the Civil War, standing in naval uniform with binoculars and sword; the statue rests upon a plinth and then a pedestal, surrounded by a semicircular, winged exedra, which features a bas-relief figure of a seated female on either side.

The Farragut statue was Saint-Gaudens's first major work and as a result certain rumors and allegations arose. Sculptor Truman Bartlett found the work "better than anyone who knew him expected" and so began a "campaign to slur and slang him," suggesting that the statue had in fact been made by sculptors in Paris.  The statue was cast in Paris by Adolphe Gruet.

The inscription on the base was composed by Stanford White's father, Richard Grant White.  John Dryfhout wrote of the inscriptions and the base that the "intermingling of natural forms of sinuous linearity with ideal reliefs and symbols, is notable as the first expression of a form of American art nouveau."  The original bluestone base, likely carved by Saint-Gaudens or his brother Louis, weathered badly and was replaced by the current granite base as a Works Project Administration project during the 1930s. The earlier base was moved to Saint-Gaudens National Historical Park  in Cornish, New Hampshire.

Study
A bronze bust that is a study for the sculpture is in the Metropolitan Museum of Art.

See also

 1881 in art

References

External links
 

1881 establishments in New York (state)
1881 sculptures
David Farragut
Bronze sculptures in New York City
Busts in New York City
Flatiron District
Granite sculptures in New York City
Monuments and memorials in Manhattan
Outdoor sculptures in Manhattan
Sculptures by Augustus Saint-Gaudens
Sculptures of men in New York City
Sculptures of the Metropolitan Museum of Art
Sculptures of women in New York City
Statues in New York City